Cyclantheropsis is a genus of flowering plants belonging to the family Cucurbitaceae.

Its native range is Tropical Africa, Madagascar.

Species:

Cyclantheropsis madagascariensis 
Cyclantheropsis occidentalis 
Cyclantheropsis parviflora

References

Cucurbitaceae
Cucurbitaceae genera